Sold is the debut solo studio album by English singer Boy George, released in 1987 by Virgin Records. The album includes George's cover of "Everything I Own", which reached number one in the United Kingdom, Ireland, and Norway, and also reached the top 10 in several other countries.

Background
Sold was released following the break-up of George's band Culture Club in 1986 and his subsequent recovery from addiction to drugs.

Commercial performance
The album was a big success in Europe, and a modest success in the UK, but failed to sell as well in the United States because George was not able to tour and promote it there due to drugs-related restrictions, so it only reached No. 145 on the Billboard 200, despite George's popularity with Culture Club in previous years. The album was nonetheless a huge hit in Italy, where it became George's highest-charting and best-selling work; Culture Club, though extremely popular in that country, never achieved such an outcome there. The album got good reviews, even if Virgin Records did not like the use of brass on many tracks.

Singles
Following on from the success of "Everything I Own", three further singles were released from the album: "Keep Me in Mind" (UK No. 29), the title track "Sold" (UK No. 24) and "To Be Reborn" (UK No. 13).

Track listing

Singles
"Everything I Own"/"Use Me"
"Keep Me in Mind"/"State of Love" (+ "I Pray '87" on the 12" maxi single)
"Sold"/“Are You Too Afraid?”
"To Be Reborn"/"Where Are You Now (When I Need You?)"

B-sides
"Use Me" – (O'Dowd, Martin, Stevens)
"State of Love" (Edit & Extended Mix) – (O'Dowd, Roy Hay, Phil Pickett)
"I Pray '87" – (O'Dowd, Hay, Jon Moss, Mikey Craig, Pickett)
"Are You Too Afraid" – (Hay, O'Dowd)

Other songs
"Let It Be" (with Ferry Aid) (Lennon/McCartney) – 6:08
"The Wishing Well" (with GOSH!) (Chris Copping) – 5:30
"Live My Life" (from the Hiding Out soundtrack)

Personnel

Musicians
Boy George –  lead male vocals
Helen Terry –  female vocals
Richie Stevens –  drums, percussion
Vic Martin –  keyboards
Glenn Nightingale –  guitars and background vocals
Ian Maidman –  bass
Paul "Wix" Wickens –  keyboards and rhythm arrangement on tracks 2, 6 & 11
Michael Timothy –  keyboards
Juliet Roberts –  backing vocals
Carroll Thompson –  backing vocals
Captain Crucial (Amos Pizzey) –  toastin'
Lorenzo Hall –  backing vocals
Jerry Hey –  arranging strings and horns

Production
Stewart Levine –  production
Glenn Skinner –  sound engineer; production on track 10
Steve Reece –  assistant sound engineer
Malcolm Garrett per Assorted iMaGes –  sleeve
Paul Gobel, Johnny Rozsa, Bill Ling –  photography

Charts and certifications

Weekly charts

Certifications

Release history

References

External links
Amazon.com: professional and customer reviews, product details, track listing and audio samples.
Lyrically Speaking: Web page including all the lyrics to the Sold album, the lyrics of its singles, B-sides, "The Wishing Well" and "Let It Be", as well as all lyrics to the songs by Culture Club, Boy George, Jesus Loves You and related projects.

1987 debut albums
Pop rock albums by English artists
Boy George albums
Albums produced by Steve Levine
Virgin Records albums
Albums recorded at RAK Studios
Albums recorded at AIR Studios